The Treaty of Belgrade, also known as the Belgrade Peace, was the peace treaty signed on September 18, 1739 in Belgrade, Habsburg Kingdom of Serbia (today Serbia), by the Ottoman Empire on one side and the Habsburg monarchy on the other, that ended the Austro–Turkish War (1737–39).

Background

Treaty
 
This treaty ended the hostilities of the five-year Austro-Russian–Turkish War (1735–39), in which the Habsburgs joined Imperial Russia in its fight against the Ottomans. Austria was defeated by the Turks at Grocka and signed a separate treaty in Belgrade with the Ottoman Empire on August 21, probably being alarmed at the prospect of Russian military success. With the Treaty of Belgrade, the Habsburgs ceded the Kingdom of Serbia with Belgrade, the southern part of the Banat of Temeswar and northern Bosnia to the Ottomans, and the Banat of Craiova (Oltenia), gained by the Treaty of Passarowitz in 1718, to Wallachia (an Ottoman subject), and set the demarcation line to the rivers Sava and Danube. The Habsburg withdrawal forced Russia to accept peace at the Russo-Turkish War, 1735-1739 with the Treaty of Niš, whereby it was allowed to build a port at Azov, gaining a foothold on the Black Sea.

The Treaty of Belgrade effectively ended the autonomy of Kingdom of Serbia which had existed since 1718. This territory would await the next Habsburg-Ottoman war to be temporarily again included into the Habsburg monarchy in 1788 with the help of Koča Anđelković.

The treaty is also notable for being one of the last international treaties to be written in Latin.

Aftermath

See also
Ottoman wars in Europe
List of treaties
List of treaties of the Ottoman Empire

Annotations

References

Sources

External links

Encyclopædia Britannica Concise - Treaty of Belgrade
WHKMLA - Serbia 1660-1789
The Encyclopedia of World History 2001: (1727-1746)

Serbia under Habsburg rule
Ottoman Serbia
18th century in Belgrade
Ottoman period in the history of Bosnia and Herzegovina
1730s in Romania
History of Oltenia
History of Wallachia (1714–1821)
Russo-Turkish wars
Belgrade, Treaty of
Belgrade
1739 treaties
Belgrade
1739 in the Habsburg monarchy
1739 in the Ottoman Empire
Habsburg monarchy–Ottoman Empire relations
Bilateral treaties of the Ottoman Empire